The Apple IIe (styled as Apple //e) is the third model in the Apple II series of personal computers produced by Apple Computer. The e in the name stands for enhanced, referring to the fact that several popular features were now built-in that were formerly only available as upgrades or add-ons in earlier models. Improved expandability combined with the new features made for a very attractive general-purpose machine to first-time computer shoppers. As the last surviving model of the Apple II computer line before discontinuation, and having been manufactured and sold for nearly 11 years with relatively few changes, the IIe earned the distinction of being the longest-lived computer in Apple's history.

History

Apple Computer planned to discontinue the Apple II series after the introduction of the Apple III in 1980; the company intended to clearly establish market segmentation by designing the Apple III to appeal to the business market, leaving the Apple II for home and education users. Management believed that "once the Apple III was out, the Apple II would stop selling in six months", cofounder Steve Wozniak later said.

By the time IBM released the rival IBM PC in 1981, the Apple II's technology was already four years old. In September 1981 InfoWorld reported—below the PC's announcement—that Apple was secretly developing three new computers "to be ready for release within a year": Lisa, Macintosh, and "Diana". Describing the last as a software-compatible Apple II replacement—"A 6502 machine using custom LSI" and a simpler motherboard—it said that Diana "was ready for release months ago" but decided to improve the design to better compete with the Xerox 820. "Now it appears that when Diana is ready for release, it will offer features and a price that will make the Apple II uncompetitive", the magazine wrote.

"Apple's plans to phase out the Apple II have also been delayed by complications in the design of the Apple III", the article also said. After the Apple III initially struggled, management decided in 1981 that the further continuation of the Apple II was in the company's best interest. After  years of the Apple II Plus, essentially at a standstill, came the introduction of a new Apple II model — the Apple IIe (codenamed "Diana" and "Super II"). The Apple IIe was released in January 1983, the successor to the Apple II Plus. The Apple IIe was the first Apple computer with a custom ASIC chip, which reduced much of the old discrete IC-based circuitry to a single chip. This change resulted in reducing the cost and size of the motherboard. Some of the hardware features of the Apple III (e.g. bank-switched memory) were borrowed in the design of the Apple IIe, and some from incorporating the Apple II Plus Language card. The culmination of these changes led to increased sales and greater market share of home, education, and small business use.

New features

One of the most notable improvements of the Apple IIe is the addition of a full ASCII character set and keyboard. The most important addition is the ability to input and display lower-case letters. Other keyboard improvements include four-way cursor control and standard editing keys (Delete and Tab), two special Apple modifier keys (Open and Solid Apple), and a safe off-to-side relocation of the "Reset" key. The auto-repeat function (any key held down to repeat same character continuously) is now automatic, no longer requiring the "REPT" key found on the keyboards of previous models.

The machine came standard with 64 KB RAM, with the equivalent of a built-in Apple Language Card in its circuitry, and had a new special "Auxiliary slot" (replacing slot 0, though electronically mapped to slot 3 for compatibility with earlier third-party 80-column cards) for adding more memory via bank-switching RAM cards. Through this slot it also includes built-in support for an 80-column text display on monitors (with the addition of a plug-in 1K memory card, via bank-switching of 40 columns) and could be easily doubled to 128 KB RAM by alternatively plugging in Apple's Extended 80-Column Text Card. As time progressed, even more memory could be added through third-party cards using the same bank-switching slot or, alternatively, general-purpose slot cards that addressed memory 1 byte at a time (i.e. Slinky RAM cards). A new ROM diagnostic routine could be invoked to test the motherboard for faults and also test its main bank of memory.

The Apple IIe lowered production costs and improved reliability by merging the function of several off-the-shelf ICs into single custom chips, reducing total chip count to 31 (previous models used 120 chips). The IIe also switched to using newer single-voltage 64x1 DRAM chips instead of the triple-voltage 16x1 DRAM in the II/II+. For this reason the motherboard design is much cleaner and runs cooler as well, with enough room to add a pin-connector for an (optional) external numeric keypad. Also added was a backport-accessible DE-9 joystick connector, making it far easier for users to add and remove game and input devices (previous models requiring plugging the joystick/paddles directly into a 16-pin DIP socket on the motherboard; the IIe retained this connector for backwards compatibility). Also improved were port openings for expansion cards. Rather than cutout V-shaped slot openings as in the Apple II and II Plus, the IIe has a variety of different-sized openings, with thumb-screw holes, to accommodate mounting interface cards with DB-xx and DE-xx connectors (removable plastic covers filled the cutouts if not used).

Although the lower IC count improved reliability over previous Apple II models, Apple still retained the practice of socketing all ICs so that servicing and replacement could be performed more easily. Later-production IIe models had the RAM soldered to the system board rather than socketed.

Despite the hardware changes, the IIe maintained a high degree of backwards compatibility with the previous models, allowing most hardware and software from those systems to be used. Apple provided technical information on the IIe to hundreds of developers before its release, and claimed that, as a result, 85 to 90% of Apple II software worked with it.

Reception
BYTE wrote in February 1983 that the IIe was "like having an Apple II with all the extras built in ... with a variety of exciting new features and capabilities" for about the same price as the Apple II. It found the computer to be highly compatible with the Apple II and praised the quality of the documentation for developers and beginners. The review concluded, "Congratulations, Apple Computer, you've produced another winner". InfoWorlds reviewers, Apple II Plus owners for four years, wished that the IIe's price were lower but stated that it "does give you more for your money, however". They also found compatibility to be very high, and concluded that "we are generally pleased with the changes Apple has provided with the IIe". Creative Computing said in December 1984 that the IIe and IIc were the best home computers with prices above $500, with the IIe better for those wanting expansion cards, color graphics, and educational and entertainment software. The magazine also chose the IIe as the best educational computer above $1000, citing Apple's strong early commitment to the market and large number of third-party education-related peripherals.

Specifications

Microprocessor
6502 or 65C02 running at 1.023 MHz
8-bit data bus
Memory
64 KB RAM built-in
16 KB ROM built-in
Expandable from 64 KB up to 1 MB RAM or more
Video modes
40 and 80 columns text, white-on-black, with 24 lines
Low-Resolution: 40×48 (16 colors)
High-Resolution: 280×192 (6 colors)
Double-Low-Resolution: 80×48 (16 colors)
Double-High-Resolution: 560×192 (16 colors)
Audio
Built-in speaker; 1-bit toggling
Built-in cassette recorder interface; 1-bit toggle output, 1-bit zero-crossing input
Expansion
Seven Apple II Bus slots (50-pin card-edge)
Auxiliary slot (60-pin card-edge)
Internal connectors
Game I/O socket (16-pin DIP)
RF modulation output (4-pin Molex)
Numeric keypad (11-pin Molex)
External connectors
NTSC composite video output (RCA connector)
Cassette in/out (two -inch mono phono jacks)
Joystick (DE-9)

Notes

Revisions
In production from January 1983 to November 1993, the Apple IIe remained relatively unchanged through the years. However, there was one significant motherboard update, a major firmware update and two cosmetically revised machines. These revisions are detailed below.

Revision A motherboard
At the time of the Apple IIe's introduction, and well into the first few months of production, this motherboard shipped with all units. Graphics modes supported are identical to, and limited to, those of the Apple II Plus before it (Double-Low/Double-High resolution is not supported). This revision logic board is also  incompatible with a small number of newer plug-in expansion slot cards. Under a free service upgrade program, Apple advised owners of the revision A to have authorized dealers replace it with the revision B motherboard.

Revision B motherboard
Shortly after the "Revision A" motherboard's release in 1983, engineers discovered that the bank-switching feature (which used a paralleled 64 KB of RAM on the Extended 80-Column Card or 1 KB to produce 80 columns using bank-switching) could also be used to produce a new graphics mode, Double-High-Resolution, which doubles the horizontal resolution and increases the number of colors from the 6 of standard High-Resolution to 16. In order to support this, some modifications had to be made to the motherboard, which became the Revision B. In addition to supporting Double-High-Resolution and a rarely used Double-Low-Resolution mode (see specifications above) it also added a special video signal accessible in slot 7.

Apple upgraded the motherboard free of charge. In later years Apple labeled newer IIe motherboards with a "-A" suffix once again, although in terms of functionality they were Revision B motherboards.

New case and keyboard
In 1984, Apple revised the case and keyboard. The original IIe uses a case very similar to the Apple II Plus, painted and with Velcro-type clips to secure the lid with a strip of metal mesh along the edge to eliminate radio frequency interference. The new case is made of dyed plastic mold in a slightly darker beige with a simplified snap-case lid. The other noticeable change is a new keyboard, with more-professional-looking print on darker keycaps (small black lettering, versus large white print). This was the first cosmetic change.

Enhanced IIe
In March 1985, the company replaced the original machine with a new revision called the Enhanced IIe. It is completely identical to the previous machine except for four chips changed on the motherboard (and a small "Enhanced" or "65C02" sticker placed over the keyboard power indicator). The purpose of the update was to make the Apple IIe more compatible with the Apple IIc (released the previous year) and, to a smaller degree, the Apple II Plus. This change involved a new processor, the CMOS-based 65C02 CPU, a new character ROM for the text modes, and two new ROM firmware chips. The 65C02 added more CPU instructions, the new character ROM added 32 special "MouseText" characters (which allowed the creation of a GUI-like display in text mode, similar to IBM code page 437), and the new ROM firmware fixed problems and speed issues with 80-column text, introduced the ability to use lowercase in Applesoft BASIC and Monitor, and contained some other smaller improvements (and fixes) in the latter two (including the return of the Mini-Assembler—which had vanished with the introduction of the II Plus firmware).

Although it affected compatibility with a small number of software titles (particularly those that did not follow Apple programming guidelines and rules, used illegal opcodes that were no longer available in the new CPU, or used the alternate 80-column character set that MouseText now occupied) a fair bit of newer software — mostly productivity applications and utilities — required the Enhanced chipset to run at all. An official upgrade kit, consisting of the four replacement chips and an "Enhanced" sticker badge, was made available for purchase to owners of the original Apple IIe. An alternative at the time, which some users chose as a cost-cutting measure, was to simply purchase their own 65C02 CPU and create (unlicensed and illegal) duplicates of the updated ROMs using re-rewritable EPROM chips. When Apple phased out the Enhancement kit in the early 1990s, this became the only available method for users looking to upgrade their IIe, and remains so right up until the present day. An Enhanced machine identifies itself with the name "Apple //e" on its start-up splash screen (as opposed to the less-specific "Apple ][").

Platinum IIe

In January 1987 came the final revision of the Apple IIe, often referred to as the Platinum IIe, due to the color change of its case to the light-grey color scheme that Apple dubbed "Platinum". Changes to this revision were mostly cosmetic to modernize the look of the machine. Besides the color change, there was a new keyboard layout with built-in numeric keypad. The keyboard was changed to match the layout of the Apple IIGS, with the reset key moved above the ESC and '1' keys, the Open and Solid Apple modifier keys replaced by Command and Option and the power LED relocated above the numeric keypad. Gone were the recessed metal ID badges (showing the Apple logo and name, with "//e" beside it) replaced with a simpler "Apple IIe" silk screened on the case lid in the Apple Garamond font. A smaller Apple logo badge remained, which was moved to the right side of the case.

Internally, a (reduced in size) Extended 80-Column Card was factory-installed, making the Platinum IIe come standard with 128 KB RAM and Double-Hi-Res graphics enabled. The motherboard has a reduced chip count by merging the two system ROM chips into one and using higher-density memory chips so its 64 KB RAM can be made up of two (64 Kbx4) chips rather than eight (64 Kbx1) chips, bringing the count down to a total of 24 chips. A solder pad location on the motherboard, present since the original IIe, for (optionally) making presses of the "Shift" keys detectable in software, is now shorted by default so that the feature is always active. Next, in a move to reduce radio frequency interference when a joystick plugs into the motherboard's game I/O socket, filtering capacitors were added. While this made no difference to the average user, it had the negative effect of lowering the available bandwidth to the socket, which is often used by specialized devices for such purposes as measuring temperature, controlling a robotic device, or even simplistic networking for data transfer to another computer. In such cases, the specialized devices were rendered useless on the Platinum IIe unless the user removed the capacitors from the board.

There were no firmware changes present, and functionally the motherboard was otherwise identical to the Enhanced IIe.  This final model of the Apple IIe (which was not sold in Europe) was quietly discontinued on November 15, 1993, which (following the discontinuation of the Apple IIGS a year earlier) effectively marked the end of the Apple II family line.

Apple IIe Card for Macintosh

In March 1991, shortly after the release of the Macintosh LC series, Apple released the PDS slot-based Apple IIe Card for the Macintosh. By plugging this card into a Macintosh LC (and later models incorporating an LC PDS slot), through hardware and (some) software emulation, the Macintosh can run most software written for the 8-bit Apple IIe computer. This miniaturized computer on a card was made possible by a chip called the Gemini, which is heavily based on the Mega II, first used in the Apple IIGS computer to emulate the Apple IIe.  The Gemini duplicates most of the functions of a standard Apple IIe, minus RAM, ROM, video generation and CPU.

Many of the built-in Macintosh peripherals can be "borrowed" by the card when in Apple II mode (i.e. extra RAM, 3-inch floppy, AppleTalk networking, clock, hard disk). It can run at either standard 1 MHz speed or an accelerated 1.9 MHz. As video is emulated using Macintosh QuickDraw routines, it is sometimes unable to keep up with the speed of a real Apple IIe, especially in the case of slower host machines. With a specialized Y-cable, the card can use an actual Apple 5.25, Apple UniDisk 3.5 and Apple II joystick or paddles. The Apple IIe Card is thought of as an Apple II compatibility solution or emulator rather than as an extension of the Apple II line.

International versions

Regional differences

The Apple IIe keyboard differed depending on what region of the world it was sold in. Sometimes the differences were very minor, such as extra local language characters and symbols printed on certain keycaps (e.g. French accented characters on the Canadian IIe such as "à", "é", "ç", etc., or the British Pound "£" symbol on the UK IIe) while other times the layout and shape of keys greatly differed (e.g. a European IIe). In order to access the local character set and keyboard layout, a user-accessible switch is found on the underside of the keyboard — flipping it will instantly switch the video output and keyboard input from the US character set to the local set. To support this, special double-capacity video and keyboard ROMs are used; in early motherboards they had to reside on a tiny circuit card that plugged into the socket. In some countries these localized IIes also support 50 Hz PAL video instead of the standard 60 Hz NTSC video and the different 220/240 volt power of that region. An equivalent of the "PAL color card" for the earlier Apple II Europlus model was integrated into the motherboard of these IIes, so that color graphics are available without the addition of a slot card.

Another difference with the European IIe, is the Auxiliary slot physically moved in location so it is in line and in front of slot 3, preventing both slots from being used simultaneously for full-sized cards. A few third-party cards are affected by this; some European cards plug into both slots simultaneously and are thus unusable on American IIes, and some American cards do not fit into the case of European IIes because the European location of the Auxiliary slot leaves less room for them.

European Platinum IIe (hybrid)
During approximately the same time period that the Platinum IIe was being produced (1987), Apple released an alternative machine for the European market. It reused the original Apple IIe case mold and keyboard, but both were redyed in the platinum color scheme—including the metal ID badges which were recolored from dark brown to platinum, blending them into the case lid. Additionally, the sticker over the keyboard power indicator was labeled "65C02" rather than "Enhanced". Internally it used the same (newer) motherboard found in the Platinum IIe with reduced chip count. Notably absent is the numeric keypad and standardized keyboard layout found on the Platinum IIe.

This cosmetic reissue of the classic IIe, with new motherboard and new coloring scheme, was only available in Europe, and therefore also had regional differences mentioned above. It has been rumored that a small number of these machines were made available in the Canadian and US markets, using the standard North American keyboard and motherboard (photographic evidence of this North American variant can be found in some period Apple II magazines). This hybrid platinum model is somewhat rare.

Upgrades

Apple IIGS upgrade kit

When the Apple IIGS computer was introduced in September 1986, Apple announced it would be making an upgrade kit for the IIe. The upgrade cost US$500, plus the trade-in of the user's existing Apple IIe motherboard and baseplate.

Users would bring their Apple IIe machines in to an authorized dealership, where the 65(C)02-based IIe motherboard and lower baseboard of the case were swapped for a 65C816-based Apple IIGS motherboard with a new baseboard.  New metal sticker ID badges replaced those on the front of the Apple IIe, rebranding the machine.  Retained were the upper half of the IIe case, the keyboard, speaker, and power supply.  Original IIGS motherboards (those produced between 1986 and mid-1989) had electrical connections for the IIe power supply and keyboard present, although only about half of the units produced had the physical plug connectors factory-soldered in.

The upgrade kit proved unpopular as it did not include a mouse; the keyboard did not mimic all the features of the Apple Desktop Bus keyboard; and some cards designed for the Apple IIGS did not fit in the Apple IIe's slanted case.  In the end, most users found they were not saving much, once they had to purchase a 3.5-inch floppy drive, analog RGB monitor, and mouse.

For a time, the Western Design Center (the company that designed the 16-bit 65C816 processor used in the Apple IIGS) also sold a 16-bit 65C802 processor that was a drop-in, pin-compatible replacement for the 65(C)02 that made the full 16-bit 65C816 instruction set available to the IIe, but using the same 8-bit data bus as the 65(C)02; however, this upgrade was insufficient, by itself, to allow IIGS software to run, as IIGS software additionally required the IIGS's firmware and specialized hardware.

See also

Apple II series
Apple II peripheral cards
Apple III
Apple IIc
Apple IIGS
KansasFest – an annual convention of Apple II users
List of publications and periodicals devoted to the Apple II

References

External links

A2Central.com  – Apple II news and downloads
Steven Weyhrich's Apple II History
PCB pictures of the Apple II
Apple2clones has information on Apple II clones
Apple2Online.com Free public-access library of Apple II software, games, documentation, hardware photos & more

E
Computer-related introductions in 1983

fr:Apple II#Apple IIe (janvier 1983)